Víctor Ruiz Torre (born 25 January 1989) is a Spanish professional footballer who plays for La Liga club Real Betis as a centre-back.

Club career

Espanyol
Born in Esplugues de Llobregat, Barcelona, Catalonia, Ruiz arrived in RCD Espanyol's youth system in 2006 at the age of 17, from neighbouring UE Cornellà. In the 2008–09 season he made his senior debut, helping the reserve side to win their Tercera División group and subsequently promote in the playoffs.

Ruiz made his debut with the first team on 6 December 2009, starting and being booked in a 4–0 home loss against Racing de Santander. Coach Mauricio Pochettino fielded him in a further 21 La Liga games that campaign, with the team finally ranking in 11th position; he added two goals, against Málaga CF (2–1 away defeat) and Atlético Madrid (3–0, home).

Napoli and Valencia
In 2010–11, Ruiz played all the minutes for Espanyol in the first 15 rounds. On 31 January 2011, he was sold to S.S.C. Napoli for €6 million cash in a four-and-a-half-year contract, with the Italians also ceding the sporting rights to Jesús Dátolo who was playing with the Spaniards on loan.

Ruiz returned to his country on 30 August 2011, after signing a five-year deal with Valencia CF for €8 million. He made his official debut on 10 September, playing the full 90 minutes in a 1–0 home victory over Atlético Madrid.

On 12 December 2013, Ruiz was sent off in a 1–1 home draw against FC Kuban Krasnodar in the group stage of the UEFA Europa League, for a professional foul on Djibril Cissé.

Villarreal
On 1 July 2015, following a one-year loan there, Ruiz transferred to Villarreal CF also in the Valencian Community for an initial €2.7 million, potentially rising to €3 million. He played his first competitive match for them in his second spell on 23 August, when he started and finished the 1–1 draw at Real Betis. 

Ruiz scored his first league goal for Villarreal on 7 April 2017, in a 3–1 home defeat of Athletic Bilbao where he also received his marching orders after a straight red card with 15 minutes left.

Beşiktaş and Betis
On 7 August 2019, Ruiz joined Beşiktaş J.K. on a three-year contract. He returned to the Spanish top flight one year later, however, with the free agent signing a one-year deal with Betis.

Ruiz agreed to an extension until 2023 at the Estadio Benito Villamarín on 4 June 2021.

International career
Shortly after making his debut with Espanyol, Ruiz was called to the Spain under-21 team by manager Luis Milla. On 8 February 2011, in the last minutes of a 2–1 friendly win over Denmark, he was sent off for punching Nicki Bille, who celebrated his goal in front of Ruiz's face.

Career statistics

Honours
Espanyol B
Tercera División: 2008–09

Betis
Copa del Rey: 2021–22

Spain U21
UEFA European Under-21 Championship: 2011

Individual
UEFA La Liga Team of the Season: 2015–16

References

External links

CiberChe biography and stats 

1989 births
Living people
People from Esplugues de Llobregat
Sportspeople from the Province of Barcelona
Spanish footballers
Footballers from Catalonia
Association football defenders
La Liga players
Segunda División B players
Tercera División players
UE Cornellà players
RCD Espanyol B footballers
RCD Espanyol footballers
Valencia CF players
Villarreal CF players
Real Betis players
Serie A players
S.S.C. Napoli players
Süper Lig players
Beşiktaş J.K. footballers
Spain youth international footballers
Spain under-21 international footballers
Spain under-23 international footballers
Catalonia international footballers
Spanish expatriate footballers
Expatriate footballers in Italy
Expatriate footballers in Turkey
Spanish expatriate sportspeople in Italy
Spanish expatriate sportspeople in Turkey